The 1985 World Women's Curling Championship (branded as 1985 H&M World Women's Curling Championship for sponsorship reasons) was held from March 17–23 at the Rosenlundshallen in Jönköping, Sweden.

Teams

Round robin standings

Round robin results

Draw 1

Draw 2

Draw 3

Draw 4

Draw 5

Draw 6

Draw 7

Draw 8

Draw 9

Tiebreaker

Playoffs

Semifinals

Bronze medal game

Final

References

World Women's Curling Championship
H&M World Women's Curling Championship
Women's curling competitions in Sweden
International curling competitions hosted by Sweden
H&M World Women's Curling Championship
Sports competitions in Jönköping
H&M World Women's Curling Championship